This is a list of androstanes, or androstane derivatives.

Androstanes

 Androstanol
 3α,5α-Androstanol (5α-androstan-3α-ol) – an endogenous CAR antagonist
 3α,5β-Androstanol (5α-androstan-3β-ol) – an endogenous CAR antagonist
 5α,17-Androstanol (5α-androstan-17-ol) – an endogenous CAR antagonist
 Androstanone
 5α-Androstanone (5α-androstan-3-one)
 Androstanediol
 3α-Androstanediol (5α-androstane-3α,17β-diol) – an endogenous androgen, estrogen, and neurosteroid
 3β-Androstanediol (5α-androstane-3β,17β-diol) – an endogenous estrogen
 Androstanedione
 5α-Androstanedione (5α-androstane-3,17-dione)
 5β-Androstanedione (5β-androstane-3,17-dione)
 Androstanolone
 Dihydrotestosterone (5α-androstan-17β-ol-3-one) – an endogenous androgen
 5β-Dihydrotestosterone (5β-androstan-17β-ol-3-one)
 Androsterone (5α-androstan-3α-ol-17-one) – an endogenous androgen and neurosteroid
 Epiandrosterone (5α-androstan-3β-ol-17-one) – an endogenous androgen
 Etiocholanolone (5β-androstan-3α-ol-17-one) – an endogenous neurosteroid
 Epietiocholanolone (5β-androstan-3β-ol-17-one)

Androstenes

 Androstenol
 3α,5α-Androstenol (5α-androst-16-en-3α-ol) – an endogenous pheromone, neurosteroid, and CAR antagonist
 3β,5α-Androstenol (5α-androst-16-en-3β-ol) – an endogenous pheromone
 Androstenone
 5α-Androstenone (5α-androst-16-en-3-one) – an endogenous pheromone
 Androstenediol
 Δ5-Androstenediol (Δ5-androsten-3β,17β-diol) – an endogenous androgen, estrogen, and testosterone intermediate
 Δ4-Androstenediol (Δ4-androsten-3β,17β-diol) – an androgen and testosterone prodrug
 Δ1-Androstenediol (Δ1-androsten-3β,17β-diol) – an androgen and δ1-testosterone prodrug
 Androstenedione
 Δ4-Androstenedione (Δ4-androsten-3,17-dione) – an endogenous androgen and testosterone intermediate
 Δ5-Androstenedione (Δ5-androsten-3,17-dione) – an androgen and testosterone prodrug
 Δ1-Androstenedione (Δ1-androsten-3,17-dione) – an androgen and δ1-testosterone prodrug
 Androstenetrione
 δ4-Androstenetrione (δ4-androstene-3,6,17-trione) – an aromatase inhibitor
 Androstenolone
 Testosterone (δ4-androsten-17β-ol-3-one) – an endogenous androgen
 δ1-Testosterone (δ1-androsten-17β-ol-3-one) – an androgen
 Epitestosterone (δ4-androsten-17α-ol-3-one) – an inactive steroid
 Dehydroepiandrosterone (δ5-androsten-3β-ol-17-one) – an endogenous androgen, neurosteroid, agonist of PPARα, PXR, and CAR, and testosterone intermediate

Androstadienes

 Androstadienol
 δ5-Androstadienol (δ5,16-androstadien-3β-ol) – an endogenous pheromone
 δ4-Androstadienol (δ4,16-androstadien-3β-ol) – a synthetic pherine
 Androstadienone
 δ4-Androstadienone (δ4,16-androstadien-3-one) – an endogenous pheromone

Anabolic steroids

Many synthetic androgens and anabolic steroids are androstane derivatives.

Some progestins, such as ethisterone and dimethisterone, are also androstane derivatives.

See also
 List of androgens/anabolic steroids

Androstanes